Horatio Walpole, 1st Baron Walpole "of Wolterton",  (8 December 16785 February 1757), English diplomatist, was a younger son of Col. Robert Walpole (1650–1700) of Houghton Hall in Norfolk, and was a younger brother of Robert Walpole, 1st Earl of Orford (1676–1745) the first Prime Minister of Great Britain.

Family 
The Walpoles owned land in Norfolk in the 12th century and took their name from Walpole, a village in the county. An early member of the family was Ralph de Walpole, bishop of Norwich from 1288 to 1299, and bishop of Ely from 1299 until his death on 20 March 1302. Among its later members were three brothers, Edward (1560–1637), Richard (1564–1607) and Michael (1570–1624), all members of the Society of Jesus. Another Jesuit in the family was Henry Walpole (1558–1595), who wrote An Epitaph of the life and death of the most famous clerk and virtuous priest Edmund Campion and was tortured and put to death on 17 April 1595.

Political career 
Born at Houghton and educated at Eton and King's College, Cambridge, Horatio Walpole became a fellow of King's. He entered Parliament in 1702, remaining a member for fifty-four years. In 1715, when his brother, Sir Robert, became first lord of the treasury, he was made Secretary to the Treasury, and in 1716, having already had some experience of the kind, he went on a diplomatic mission to The Hague. He left office with his brother in 1717, but he was soon in harness again, becoming secretary to the lord-lieutenant of Ireland in 1720 and Secretary to the Treasury a second time in 1721.

In 1722 he was again at The Hague, and in 1723 he went to Paris, where in the following year he was appointed envoy extraordinary and minister plenipotentiary. He got on intimate terms with Fleury and seconded his brother in his efforts to maintain friendly relations with France; he represented Great Britain at the congress of Soissons and helped to conclude the treaty of Seville (November 1729). He left Paris in 1730 and in 1734 went to represent his country at The Hague, where he remained until 1740, using all his influence in the cause of European peace. He was nonetheless able to stay involved in the affairs of the capital. He served, for example, in 1739, as a founding governor for London's most fashionable charity of the time, the Foundling Hospital.

After the fall of Sir Robert Walpole in 1742, Horatio defended his conduct in the House of Commons and also in a pamphlet, "The Interest of Great Britain steadily pursued". Later he wrote an "Apology", dealing with his own conduct from 1715 to 1739, and an "Answer to the latter part of Lord Bolingbroke's letters on the study of history" (printed 1763).

In 1724 he engaged Thomas Ripley to design him a new house at Wolterton in Norfolk to replace one that had burnt down. The house called Wolterton Hall was completed in 1742.

In 1756 he was created Baron Walpole, of Wolterton and he died 5February 1757 at his house in Whitehall.

Personal life 
By his wife, Mary Magdalen Lombard, whom he married on 21 July 1720, he had nine children:
Horatio Walpole, 2nd Baron Walpole (1723–1809), created Earl of Orford in 1806
The Hon. Mary Walpole (born 25 February 1726), who married Maurice Suckling.
The Hon. Thomas Walpole (6 October 1727 – March 1803), who married Elizabeth Vanneck (died 9 June 1760) on 14 November 1753, and had issue.
The Hon. Richard Walpole (5 December 1728 – 18 August 1798), who married Margaret Vanneck (before 1742 – 9 May 1818) on 22 November 1758, and had issue.
Susan Walpole (3 May 1730 – 29 April 1732)
The Hon. Henrietta Louisa Walpole (28 November 1731 – June 1824)
The Hon. Anne Walpole (12 July 1733 – 25 November 1797)
Caroline Walpole (22 November 1734 – 11 January 1737)
The Hon. Robert Walpole (1736–1810)

References

External links 

 Horatio Walpole | National Portrait Gallery 

1678 births
1757 deaths
People educated at Eton College
Alumni of King's College, Cambridge
Barons in the Peerage of Great Britain
Peers of Great Britain created by George II
Diplomatic peers
English MPs 1702–1705
English MPs 1705–1707
Members of the Parliament of Great Britain for English constituencies
Members of the Parliament of Great Britain for constituencies in Cornwall
British MPs 1710–1713
British MPs 1713–1715
British MPs 1715–1722
British MPs 1722–1727
British MPs 1727–1734
British MPs 1734–1741
British MPs 1741–1747
British MPs 1747–1754
British MPs 1754–1761
Members of the Privy Council of Great Britain
Robert Walpole
Horatio
Ambassadors of Great Britain to France
Ambassadors of Great Britain to the Netherlands

Chief Secretaries for Ireland
Members of the Parliament of Great Britain for Bere Alston
People from Houghton, Norfolk